The Indian Army Service Corps (IASC) is a corps and an arm of the Indian Army which handles its logistic support function. It is the oldest and the largest administrative service in the Indian Army. While the history of supply and transport services is as old as the history of organized warfare itself it was in 1760 that the very rudimentary supply and transport organizations of the three presidencies of the East India Company were brought under the council of a single authority.

Role

The ASC is mainly responsible for the provisioning, procurement and distribution of Supplies of food ration, fresh & dry eatable items, FOL(Fuels, oil, lubricants), Hygiene Chemicals and items of Hospital Comforts to Army, Air Force and when required for Navy and other para military forces. The operation of Mechanical Transport except first line transport and fighting vehicles and the provision and operation of first and second line Animal Transport is also the responsibility of the ASC. The other responsibilities include carriage and distribution of ammunition including mines, forward of the Corps Maintenance Area in the field in case of plains, and forward of Divisional Maintenance Area in case of mountain formation, packing of commodities for supply, loading of aircraft and ejection of loads, training and provisioning of clerks for all branches of staff at formation headquarters and the training and provisioning of catering staff in the army. This Corps is a versatile one designed for the role with wide parameters for multifarious activities of immediate concern to the troops. The Corps also handle postal services in forward areas.

History
The origin of the corps go back to 1760 when a Commissariat used to exist in the administrative component of the armies three Presidencies of Bengal, Madras and Bombay. In 1878 the separate Commissariats were amalgamated into a single entity and then in 1901 it was renamed the Supply and Transport Corps. During the First World War the corps became a permanent component of the British Indian Army and was renamed the Indian Army Service Corps in 1923. In 1935 the corps was granted the 'Royal' prefix and became known as Royal Indian Army Service Corps (RIASC).

After India gained independence in 1947, the corps underwent further expansion and by 1948 Indian Catering Corps and Indian Army Corps of Clerks were amalgamated into the corps. The Food Testing Laboratories were also placed under the control of RIASC. On 8 December 1950, after India became a republic, the corps dropped the use of the 'Royal' prefix and was once again renamed the Indian Army Service Corps. Since that day the corps has celebrated its Raising Day on 8 December. A proposal for the award of regimental colours to the Corps was initiated in 1952 and was approved in October 1967. To coincide with the Colour presentation first ever Reunion of ASC was also held. The new Corps Colours were presented by the President of India, Dr Zakir Hussain to the Corps on 8 December 1967 on the 207th Corps Anniversary, at ASC Centre (South), Bangalore. Lt SSK Raheja had the rare and enviable privilege and honour of being selected as the Colour Ensign, he received the Corps Colours from the President. The second regimental Colours were presented on the occasion of Third Reunion by Gen OP Malhotra, COAS on 8 December 1979.

See also
Indian Army Pioneer Corps

References

External links
 Official website of the Indian Army

Administrative corps of the Indian Army